Bhausabari Bajar is a village in the Kanepokhari Rural Municipality in the Morang District of Province No. 1, south-eastern Nepal.
It is the center of Kanepokhari Ward 5, which had a population of 6,776 in 2011.

Location

Bhausabari Bajar is in Nepal, Province 1, Morang, Kanepokhari.
The Köppen climate classification is Cwa: Monsoon-influenced humid subtropical climate.

Population

In 2068 BS (2011 CE) Kanepokhari Ward 5 had 1,558 households with a total population of 6,776 of which 3,107 were male and 3,669 were female.
The ward was previously Keroun Wards 1, 2 and 5.

Facilities

The Shree Secondary School, Bhausabari Keraun-1 has 90 students. It is under the Public S.S Banigama.

Communications

Bhausabari lies along and to the west of Kanepokhari-Rangeli Road, south of Ramailo and north of Dhikuadagi.
The Kanepokhari – Jahada – Bhausabari road leads north to Jahada, Kanepokhari from the west side of the village. It is graveled along its  length.

References

Kanepokhari Rural Municipality